Smaug regius (also known as the regal girdled lizard) is a species of lizard in the family Cordylidae. It is a small lizard found in Zimbabwe.

References

Smaug (genus)
Reptiles of Zimbabwe
Reptiles described in 1962
Taxa named by Donald George Broadley